Carolyn Haines (born May 12, 1953 in Hattiesburg, Mississippi), who uses the pseudonyms R.B. Chesterton, Caroline Burnes, and Lizzie Hart,  is a prolific mystery author and former journalist specializing in mysteries set in the Mississippi Delta.

Biography
Haines is the daughter of Roy and Hilda Haines, both journalists.  Haines grew up in Lucedale, Mississippi,  and graduated from high school there in 1971.  She received a bachelor's degree in journalism from the University of Southern Mississippi in 1974 and a master's degree in creative writing from the University of South Alabama in 1985.  For over ten years she was a reporter and journalist for newspapers such as the George County Times, the Mobile Press-Register, The Mississippi Press, The Huntsville Times, and the Hattiesburg American.

Her current mysteries are the Sarah Booth Delaney Mississippi Delta series, set in the fictional town of Zinnia. The humorous series has won numerous accolades, including Best Amateur Sleuth. "Hallowed Bones," the fifth in the series, was named in the top five mysteries of 2004 by Library Journal.

Haines also writes darker crime novels and general fiction. "Penumbra" was named one of the top five mysteries of 2006 by Library Journal. She has written under the pseudonyms Caroline Burnes in romantic mysteries, and Lizzie Hart in humor.

She taught the graduate and undergraduate fiction writing classes at the University of South Alabama, where she was an assistant professor and Fiction Coordinator.

Awards & praise
2010 Harper Lee Award winner for Alabama's Distinguished Writer of the Year
Received Alabama State Council on the Arts literary fellowship for her writing
2009 Richard Wright Award for Literary Excellence

Bibliography

As herself

The Sarah Booth Delaney Mysteries

Sticks and Bones. Minotaur Books. 2017. .
Charmed Bones. Minotaur Books. 2018. .
A Gift of Bones. Minotaur Books. 2018. .
Game of Bones. Minotaur Books. 2019. .
The Devil's Bones. Minotaur Books. 2020. .
A Garland of Bones. Minotaur Books. 2020. .
Independent Bones. Minotaur Books. 2021. .
Lady of Bones. Minotaur Books. 2022. .
Bones of Holly. Minotaur Books. 2022. ISBN 9781250833754.

Sarah Booth Delaney Short Stories 

 "Bones on the Bayou" (2014)
 "Shorty Bones" (2014)
 "Guru Bones" (2015)
 "Jingle Bones" (2015)
 "Bones and Arrows" (2016)
 "Clacking Bones" (2018 - novella)
 "Enchanted Bones" (2020)

The Jexville Chronicles 

 Summer of the Redeemers (1994)
 Touched (1996)
 Judas Burning (2005)

Non-series 
Deception (2012)
Skin Dancer (2011)
Fever Moon (2007)
Revenant (2007)
Penumbra (2006)
My Mother's Witness: The Peggy Morgan Story (2003)

Short stories

 "The Christmas Ornament" in Haunted Holidays: Three Short Tales of Horror (2014)
 "The Sugar Cure" in Delta Blues (2010)
 "Ode to the Fruitcake" in Christmas Memories from Mississippi (2010)
 "The Cypress Dream" in Florida Heat Wave (2010)
 "Neighborhood Watch" in Damn Near Dead II (2010)
 "The Wish" in Many Bloody Returns (2009)
 "Carolyn Haines" in Growing Up in Mississippi (2008)

As editor
Delta Blues (2010)

As R.B. Chesterton

"The Hanged Man: A Short Story" (2014)

External links
 Official website

1953 births
Living people
20th-century American novelists
21st-century American novelists
American crime fiction writers
American romantic fiction writers
American women novelists
People from Lucedale, Mississippi
Writers from Mississippi
Women romantic fiction writers
20th-century American women writers
21st-century American women writers
People from Hattiesburg, Mississippi
University of South Alabama faculty
University of Southern Mississippi alumni
University of South Alabama alumni
American women journalists
Women mystery writers
Journalists from Alabama
Journalists from Mississippi
Novelists from Mississippi
Novelists from Alabama
20th-century American non-fiction writers
21st-century American non-fiction writers
Writers from Mobile, Alabama
American women academics